Hemipyxis is a genus of flea beetles in the family Chrysomelidae. They are found in Sub-Saharan Africa, eastern Asia, and Australasia.

Species
These 27 species, along with a number of others, belong to the genus Hemipyxis:

 Hemipyxis apicicostata Kimoto, 1989  (temperate Asia)
 Hemipyxis balyi Bates, 1866  (temperate Asia)
 Hemipyxis bipustulata (Jacoby, 1894) (Oceania)
 Hemipyxis changi Kimoto, 1970  (temperate Asia)
 Hemipyxis flava (Clark, 1865) (Oceania)
 Hemipyxis flaviabdominalis Chujo, 1965  (temperate Asia)
 Hemipyxis flavipes Kimoto, 1978  (temperate Asia)
 Hemipyxis formosana Chujo, 1937  (temperate Asia)
 Hemipyxis fulvipennis (Illiger, 1807) (Oceania)
 Hemipyxis fulvoculata Takizawa, 1979  (temperate Asia)
 Hemipyxis kinabaluensis Takizawa, 2017
 Hemipyxis lineata Kimoto, 1978  (temperate Asia)
 Hemipyxis liukueiana Kimoto, 1996  (temperate Asia)
 Hemipyxis lusca (Fabricius, 1801)
 Hemipyxis nigricornis (Baly, 1877)  (temperate Asia)
 Hemipyxis persimilis Kimoto, 1996  (temperate Asia)
 Hemipyxis plagioderoides Motschulsky, 1861
 Hemipyxis quadrimaculata (Jacoby, 1892)
 Hemipyxis quadripustulata (Baly, 1876)  (temperate Asia)
 Hemipyxis rarashana Kimoto, 1996  (temperate Asia)
 Hemipyxis semiviridis (Jacoby, 1894)
 Hemipyxis sumatrana (Jacoby, 1884) (Oceania)
 Hemipyxis taihorinensis S.Kimoto, 1966  (temperate Asia)
 Hemipyxis takedai Kimoto, 1976  (temperate Asia)
 Hemipyxis tonkinensis (Chen, 1933)
 Hemipyxis yasumatsui Kimoto, 1970  (temperate Asia)
 Hemipyxis yuae Lee & Staines, 2009  (temperate Asia)

References

Alticini
Chrysomelidae genera
Taxa named by Pierre François Marie Auguste Dejean